A transport corridor is a generally linear area that is defined by one or more modes of transportation crossing the limits of more than one city or county like highways, railroads or public transit which share a common destination. Development often occurs around transportation corridors because they carry so many people, creating linear agglomerations like the Las Vegas Strip or the linear form of many neighborhood retail areas.

A 2019 review and meta-analysis of research into transport corridors found that they improved economic welfare, but had adverse environmental impacts.

Examples
TEN-T Core Network Corridors - planned infrastructure network in the European Union
 Transportation Corridor Agencies - administrative body for toll roads in Orange County, California.
 Pan-European corridors - planned intercity rail network in Central and Eastern Europe
 Western Railway Corridor - proposed rail network in western Ireland
 Southeast High Speed Rail Corridor - proposed high-speed rail network in the Mid-Atlantic and Southeastern United States
 Northeast Corridor - Amtrak high-speed rail network in the Northeast megalopolis of the United States
 Panama Canal - artificial waterway linking the Atlantic Ocean and the Pacific Ocean

SE Asia
Sourced from 
 North-South Economic Corridor
 East-West Economic Corridor
 Southern Economic Corridor

See also
 Ribbon development
 Linear settlement
 Right-of-way (transportation)

References

Rail infrastructure
Road infrastructure
 
Urban studies and planning terminology